Jennifer O'Dell (born November 27, 1974, in Ridgecrest, California) is an American film and television actress. She is best known for the role of Veronica on the television series Sir Arthur Conan Doyle's The Lost World.

Biography
At the age of eight, O'Dell was cast in a national candy commercial at her very first audition. She took a hiatus through high school to enjoy her youth, but resumed her acting career soon after graduation. She guest starred on a number of television series, including Beverly Hills, 90210. In 1999 she gained fame as the scantily-clad Veronica on The Lost World. This role elevated her career and she has since appeared in several films and guest starred on such popular television shows as Scrubs, NCIS, and Two and a Half Men. She appeared in the TV series CSI: Miami episode "Nailed" as Charlene Hartford, the woman responsible for accidentally injuring the character Ryan Wolfe with a nailgun.

She lives in Southern California and has two sons, Logan and Ledger.

O'Dell has also been a professional photographer since 2009.

Filmography

Film

Television

References

External links
 Official site
 

1974 births
Actresses from California
American film actresses
American television actresses
American soap opera actresses
Living people
People from Ridgecrest, California
American child actresses
21st-century American women